James Cooper Smeaton (July 22, 1890 – October 3, 1978) was a Canadian professional ice hockey player, referee and head coach.  He served as the National Hockey League (NHL)'s referee-in-chief from 1917 until 1937. Smeaton served as a Stanley Cup trustee from 1946 until his death in 1978. Smeaton was inducted into the Hockey Hall of Fame in 1961.

Biography
Smeaton was born in Carleton Place, Ontario. When he was three years of age, Smeaton's family moved to the Westmount suburb of Montreal, Quebec. During his youth, Smeaton played baseball, football and ice hockey for the Westmount Amateur Athletic Association. By 1908, Smeaton had started refereeing ice hockey games, including those of the Montreal Insurance Hockey League.

Smeaton moved to New York in 1910 and played one season of point for the New York Wanderers, while working for Spalding Sporting Goods. On the New York Wanderers Smeaton played alongside fellow Montreal Westmount products Sprague and Odie Cleghorn. Although praised by the Brooklyn Daily Eagle after the season as the best point player in the league (AAHL) the newspaper also pointed out that the Wanderers were involved in many rough house incidents and that Smeaton's "principal fault lies in the fact that he is inclined not only toward dirty play, but also left a poor impression upon many of the spectators through his actions on the ice."

Smeaton returned to Montreal for family reasons and joined Sun Life Insurance and started refereeing amateur games as a sideline.  In 1913, he joined the National Hockey Association (NHA) as a referee. In his first game in 1913, between the Montreal Canadiens and the Montreal Wanderers, he was confronted by Newsy Lalonde after calling an offside. Smeaton promptly fined Lalonde $5 (Lalonde, known as a bit of a "tightwad", never repeated the incident).

In 1914, Smeaton joined the Canadian military to serve in the First World War. Smeaton served with the 11th Canadian Siege Battery in France. He was awarded the Military Medal for his service. Smeaton would later be active in the Norman Mitchell VC Branch of the Royal Canadian Legion in Mount Royal, where he lived. In September 1959, Smeaton organized a fund-raising intra-squad game by the Montreal Canadiens to benefit the branch's welfare fund.

Smeaton became the NHL's first referee in chief when the NHL formed in 1917. Smeaton was offered the general manager's job of the expansion New York Rangers in 1926, but turned it down to remain in Montreal. He served as referee until 1930 when he became the head coach of the Philadelphia Quakers. The Quakers played only one season, 1930–31, finishing out of the playoffs. The following season, Smeaton resumed refereeing. He refereed in the NHL until 1937 when he retired. Smeaton, who officiated numerous Stanley Cup and Allan Cup finals, would be inducted as an on-ice official into the Hockey Hall of Fame in 1961.

Part of the reason Smeaton retired from hockey was to attend to his business career. He retired to accept a promotion to assistant branch manager at Sun Life. Smeaton later became Ottawa branch manager before returning to Montreal to become Montreal branch manager in 1944. Smeaton would continue at Sun Life until retiring in 1954. Smeaton served as president of the Montreal Life Insurance Underwriters Association.

P. D. Ross appointed Smeaton trustee of the Stanley Cup on February 24, 1946, replacing the late William Foran. During his term as trustee, the NHL was given control over the Stanley Cup, allowing the league to reject challenges for the Cup from other leagues. As part of his duties Smeaton would, on occasion, present the Cup to the Stanley-Cup winning championship team.

Smeaton remained active in retirement with golf. Smeaton died on October 3, 1978 at the Royal Victoria Hospital in Montreal. He was survived by his wife Victoria. Smeaton is buried in Mount Royal Cemetery in Montreal.

NHL coaching record

References

General references

External links

 
 
 National Hockey League Official Association biography

1890 births
1978 deaths
Canadian ice hockey coaches
Canadian ice hockey officials
Canadian military personnel of World War I
Hockey Hall of Fame inductees
Burials at Mount Royal Cemetery
National Hockey League officials
People from Carleton Place
Philadelphia Quakers (NHL) coaches
Sportspeople from Ontario
Canadian recipients of the Military Medal